Malik Aftab (born 24 June 1996) is a Pakistani first-class cricketer who plays for Lahore.

References

External links
 

1996 births
Living people
Pakistani cricketers
Lahore cricketers
Cricketers from Lahore